Norway competed at the 1964 Summer Olympics in Tokyo, Japan.  26 competitors, 24 men and 2 women, took part in 23 events in 6 sports. It was only the second time that Norwegian athletes failed to win any medals at the Olympic Games.

Athletics

Men's 5000 metres
Thor Helland
 Heat — 13:52.4 min (→ advanced to the final)
 Final — 13:57.0 min (→ 8th place)

Men's 10,000 metres
Pål Benum — 30:00.8 min (→ 19th place)

Women's long jump
Berit Berthelsen
 Qualification — 6.32 m (→ advanced to the final)
 Final — 6.19 m (→ 9th place)
Oddrun Hokland
 Qualification — 6.03 m (→ advanced to the final)
 Final — 5.68 m (→ 16th place)

Men's javelin throw
 Terje Pedersen
 Qualification — 72.10 metres (→ did not advance)
 Willy Rasmussen
 Qualification — 68.43 metres (→ did not advance)

Women's pentathlon
Oddrun Hokland — 4429 pts (→ 16th place)

Gymnastics

Rowing

Coxed Four
Tor Ahlsand
Birger Knudtzon
Ingolf Kristiansen

Sailing

Shooting

Three shooters represented Norway in 1964.

25 m pistol
 Nicolaus Zwetnow

300 m rifle, three positions
 Magne Landrø
 Thormod Næs

50 m rifle, three positions
 Magne Landrø

50 m rifle, prone
 Thormod Næs
 Magne Landrø

Wrestling

References

External links
Official Olympic Reports
International Olympic Committee results database

Nations at the 1964 Summer Olympics
1964
1964 in Norwegian sport